South Carolina Highway 191 (SC 191) is a  state highway in the U.S. state of South Carolina. The highway connects Warrenville and Johnston.

Route description
SC 191 begins at an intersection with SC 421 (Augusta Road) on the border of two Aiken County census designated places: Warrenville and Gloverville. From this intersection, the roadway continues as Howlandville Road. SC 191 travels to the north-northwest and immediately crosses over a railroad track and the Sand River, and has an interchange with U.S. Route 1 (US 1) and US 78 (Jefferson Davis Highway) on the border of Warrenville and Graniteville. It travels to the north-northeast and crosses over the site of the Graniteville, South Carolina, train crash, in which nine people died when two trains collided in 2005. It passes the Leavelle McCampbell Middle School. SC 191 turns left onto Old Graniteville Highway and immediately crosses over the Graniteville Canal. A short distance later is a crossing of Bridge Creek. The highway parallels Flat Rock Pond and Horse Creek. In Vaucluse, the highway crosses over Good Spring Branch. Then, it passes a U.S. Post Office branch on the southeastern edge of Vaucluse Pond. It curves to the northeast and travels underneath, but does not have an interchange with Interstate 20. In a rural part of the county, it intersects SC 19 (Edgefield Highway).

The two highways travel concurrently to the north-northwest. They split in Eureka. SC 191 crosses over Shaw Creek. Then, it curves to the north-northwest and enters Edgefield County. The highway continues traveling through rural areas and crosses over Hall Branch before it meets its northern terminus, an intersection with SC 121, in the extreme southern part of Johnston.

Major intersections

See also

References

External links

SC 191 at Virginia Highways' South Carolina Highways Annex

191
Transportation in Aiken County, South Carolina
Transportation in Edgefield County, South Carolina